The Eleventh Dynasty of ancient Egypt (notated Dynasty XI) is a well-attested group of rulers. Its earlier members before Pharaoh Mentuhotep II are grouped with the four preceding dynasties to form the First Intermediate Period, whereas the later members are considered part of the Middle Kingdom. They all ruled from Thebes in Upper Egypt.

Characteristics
The relative chronology of the 11th Dynasty is well established by contemporary attestations and, except for count Intef and Mentuhotep IV, by the Turin canon.

Manetho's statement that Dynasty XI consisted of 16 kings, who reigned for 43 years is contradicted by contemporary inscriptions and the evidence of the Turin King List, whose combined testimony establishes that this kingdom consisted of seven kings who ruled for a total of 143 years. However, his testimony that this dynasty was based at Thebes is verified by the contemporary evidence. It was during this dynasty that all of ancient Egypt was united under the Middle Kingdom.

This dynasty traces its origins to a nomarch of Thebes, "Intef the Great, son of Iku", who is mentioned in a number of contemporary inscriptions. However, his immediate successor Mentuhotep I is considered the first king of this dynasty.

An inscription carved during the reign of Wahankh Intef II shows that he was the first of this dynasty to claim to rule over the whole of Egypt, a claim which brought the Thebans into conflict with the rulers of Herakleopolis Magna, Dynasty X. Intef undertook several campaigns northwards, and captured the important nome of Abydos.

Warfare continued intermittently between the Thebean and Heracleapolitan dynasts until the 14th regnal year of Nebhepetre Mentuhotep II, when the Herakleopolitans were defeated, and this dynasty could begin to consolidate their rule.  The rulers of Dynasty XI reasserted Egypt's influence over her neighbors in Africa and the Near East.  Mentuhotep II sent renewed expeditions to Phoenicia to obtain cedar. Sankhkara Mentuhotep III sent an expedition from Coptos south to the land of Punt.

The reign of its last king, and thus the end of this dynasty, is something of a mystery. Contemporary records refer to "seven empty years" following the death of Mentuhotep III, which correspond to the reign of Nebtawyra Mentuhotep IV. Modern scholars identify his vizier Amenemhat with Amenemhat I, the first king of Dynasty XII, as part of a theory that Amenemhat became king as part of a palace coup. The only certain details of Mentuhotep's reign was that two remarkable omens were witnessed at the quarry of Wadi Hammamat by the vizier Amenemhat.

Pharaohs of the Eleventh Dynasty

See also
 Eleventh Dynasty of Egypt family tree

Notes

External links 
 

 
States and territories established in the 3rd millennium BC
States and territories disestablished in the 20th century BC
11
21st century BC in Egypt
20th century BC in Egypt
3rd-millennium BC establishments in Egypt
2nd-millennium BC disestablishments in Egypt
11
11